Marie François (born 14 August 1993) is a French handball player for OGC Nice Côte d'Azur Handball and the French national team.

References

1993 births
Living people
French female handball players